Yeh Dil (English: This Heart) is a 2003 Indian Hindi romantic drama film directed by Teja, starring Tusshar Kapoor and Anita Hassanandani. The film was an official remake of 2001 hit Telugu film Nuvvu Nenu. Anita Hassanandani reprised her role from Nuvvu Nenu, which was also remade in Bengali as Dujone with Dev and Srabanti in the lead roles.

Synopsis
Ravi Pratap Singh (Tusshar Kapoor) is a college student and the son of a wealthy businessman Raghuraj Pratap Singh (Akhilendra Mishra). His best friend Kabir always helps him. Ravi lives with his father, as his mother died. Vasundhara Yadav (Anita Hassanandani), is the daughter of a middle class wrestler Mithua Yadav (Vineet Kumar) studying in the same college. She lives in a joint family with many of her relatives. Ravi excels in sports, but is terrible in academics. Vasu doesn't pay attention to sports and focuses on academics.

Ravi is neglected by Raghuraj who always focuses on business and wealth. Raghuraj expects him to excel in academics, so he can send him to Harvard Business School. Similarly, Mithua, who wanted a boy, neglects Vasu and his wife (Chetana Das).

Ravi and Vasu start studying together and gradually become friends and eventually fall in love, but Raghuraj disapproves of her due to her social status. Mithua sends some goons to the college who beat up Ravi. Raghuraj orders the police to retaliate, and Mithua is taken to the police station and beaten up by the police. Vasu tells Ravi, after which he calls his father and threatens him.

Raghuraj arranges a "swaymvar" for his son, to which all the business tycoons and rich people send their daughters. Ravi invites Vasu and publicly proclaims his love for her. Mithua discovers she went to Ravi's house and confronts Raghuraj, after which the police commissioner tells them they should trick Ravi and Vasu into keeping their love on hold until the completion of their studies.

After this agreement, Ravi is tricked into going to Mumbai and Vasu is tricked into going to her uncle's house. Both escape, Ravi goes to Hyderabad, and Vasu goes to Mumbai. Ravi thinks Vasu is in Hyderabad and goes to her house, only to be beaten up by goons. Vasu goes to Mumbai, and is captured and taken to Ravi's house where Raghuraj arranges for a killer to kill Vasu. Both are saved and they return to Hyderabad to get married with the help of Kabir and college. Mithua eventually accepts the marriage and stops her aunt Chandi (Pratima Kazmi) from interfering. Raghuraj is also stopped from interfering. Ravi and Vasundhara marry and the last scene shows Kabir and the whole college congratulating them.

Cast
 Tusshar Kapoor as Ravi Pratap Singh
 Anita Hassanandani as Vasundhara Ravi Pratap Singh
 Supriya Karnik as Mrs. Chaudhary
 Banerjee as Pandit, the goons
 Pratima Kazmi as Chandi (Mithua's sister)
 Vineet Kumar as Mithua Yadav
 Akhilendra Mishra as Raghuraj Pratap Singh
 Chetana Das as Vasundhara's mother
 Mushtaq Khan as College Director
 Sharat Saxena as Police Commissioner
 Saurabh Shukla as Economics Teacher
 Achyut Potdar as Mansukh
 Anupam Shyam as Inspector
 Sunila as Dance teacher

Soundtrack
The songs were composed by Nadeem Shravan, while the lyrics were written by Sameer.

Box office
Yeh Dil performed very poorly at the box office and was declared a disaster.

References

External links 
 

2003 films
2000s Hindi-language films
Films scored by Nadeem–Shravan
Hindi remakes of Telugu films
Indian romantic drama films
2003 romantic drama films
Films directed by Teja (film director)